Yosia Nadiope was a past Kyabazinga of Busoga, Uganda.

References 

Busoga
Ugandan monarchies
Ugandan chiefs